Kamran Khan is a Pakistani journalist. He currently hosts the talk show Dunya Kamran Khan Kay Sath on Dunya News.

Previously, he worked for Geo News where he was the host then-known show Aaj Kamran Khan Ke Saath.

In 2014, he left Geo News and joined Bol News. 
In 2015, he left Bol News and joined Dunya News.

References

External links
In Search of Al Qaeda - Interview with Kamran Khan on 13 September 2002 by FRONTLINE TV Program of Public Broadcasting System (PBS) of the United States

Geo News newsreaders and journalists
Living people
Pakistani investigative journalists
University of Karachi alumni
Journalists from Karachi
Pakistani television journalists
Pakistani television hosts
BOL Network people
1967 births